Qadeer Ahmed Khan (born 15 November 1985) is a Pakistani-born cricketer who played for the United Arab Emirates national cricket team. He made his One Day International debut for the United Arab Emirates against Hong Kong in the 2015–17 ICC World Cricket League Championship on 18 November 2015. He made his Twenty20 International debut for the UAE against Oman on 22 November 2015.

In January 2018, he was named in the United Arab Emirates's squad for the 2018 ICC World Cricket League Division Two tournament. In December 2018, he was named in the United Arab Emirates' team for the 2018 ACC Emerging Teams Asia Cup.

In September 2019, he was named in the United Arab Emirates' squad for the 2019 ICC T20 World Cup Qualifier tournament in the UAE. However, the following month, he was dropped from the UAE's squad for the tournament. Two days before the start of the tournament, the ICC confirmed that Ahmed had been suspended, after breaching cricket's anti-corruption rules. In April 2021, Qadeer was banned from all cricket for five years, backdated from 16 October 2019.

References

External links
 

1985 births
Living people
Emirati cricketers
United Arab Emirates One Day International cricketers
United Arab Emirates Twenty20 International cricketers
Cricketers from Attock
Cricketers banned for corruption
Pakistani emigrants to the United Arab Emirates
Pakistani expatriate sportspeople in the United Arab Emirates